David Edward Hamilton (born December 13, 1947) is a former professional baseball pitcher. He played in Major League Baseball (MLB) from 1972 to 1980, and won three World Series championships as a member of the Oakland Athletics.

Oakland A's
Hamilton was drafted out of Edmonds High School in Edmonds, Washington by the Kansas City Athletics in the fifth round of the 1966 Major League Baseball draft. He won his major league debut on May 29, starting the second game of a doubleheader with the Texas Rangers.

He ended the season at 6–6 with a 2.93 earned run average as the A's headed to the 1972 American League Championship Series against the Detroit Tigers. Hamilton made only one appearance in the ALCS, blowing a save opportunity in game four. He appeared twice in the World Series against the Cincinnati Reds. He faced just one batter, Joe Morgan in game five, and got a double play on a fly ball to Matty Alou in right field in which Pete Rose tried to score from third. In game six, the "Big Red Machine" tagged Hamilton for four runs in just two-thirds of an inning.

He was traded along with Chet Lemon from the Athletics to the Chicago White Sox for Stan Bahnsen and Skip Pitlock at the non-waiver trade deadline on June 15, .

Chicago White Sox
Though Hamilton had been used as both a starter and reliever in Oakland, he was used strictly out of the bullpen by White Sox manager, Chuck Tanner. He earned his first major league save on June 25, and went on to earn 25 in three seasons with the club. On November 28, he and Silvio Martinez were sent to the St. Louis Cardinals to complete an August 31 deal in which the Chisox sent two players to be named later to the Cards for Clay Carroll.

St. Louis Cardinals
Hamilton got off to a poor start with the Cardinals, and soon found himself doing mop-up duty for manager Vern Rapp. When Ken Boyer replaced Rapp at the helm, Hamilton was given the opportunity to redeem himself, but after blowing a save against the San Diego Padres on back-to-back home runs by Gene Tenace and Rick Sweet, found himself again in the mop-up role. He appeared in thirteen games for the Cardinals, all of which were losses, and was 0–0 with a 6.43 ERA when his contract was sold to the Pittsburgh Pirates.

Pittsburgh Pirates
After losing his first game as a Pirate, Hamilton earned his first save of the season against the New York Mets shortly afterwards. He began seeing more time in pressure situations, but after failing to perform, found himself again in the now familiar mop-up role. Following the season, he returned to Oakland as a free agent.

Return to Oakland
Hamilton went 3–4 with five saves and a 3.70 ERA for Oakland in 1979. He split  between Oakland and the Ogden A's, going 0–3 with an 11.40 ERA at the major league level.

Career stats

Hamilton was 4-for-26 in 1972 with five walks and two runs scored. In seven more at-bats (in 1978), he never reached base again.

Personal life
He currently lives in California with his wife, Lynn, and has three grown children Jonathan, Brian and Christy as well as his grandchildren, Austin, Matthew, Briley, Cole, Joshua, Ellie, and Jake. He is also a project manager for a roofing contractor.

References

External links

Baseball Almanac
Baseball Gauge
Retrosheet
Venezuelan Professional Baseball League

1947 births
Living people
Baseball players from Seattle
Birmingham A's players
Burlington Bees players
Chicago White Sox players
Iowa Oaks players
Leesburg A's players
Leones del Caracas players
American expatriate baseball players in Venezuela
Lewiston Broncs players
Lodi Crushers players
Major League Baseball pitchers
Oakland Athletics players
Ogden A's players
Peninsula Grays players
Pittsburgh Pirates players
St. Louis Cardinals players
Tacoma Tigers players
Tigres de Aragua players
Tucson Toros players
People from San Ramon, California